WIMS is a ratio station in Michigan City, Indiana.

WIMS may also refer to:

 Wireless Integrated MicroSystems, a collaboration of Michigan universities
 WWW Interactive Multipurpose Server, an online mathematics exercise application server
 Engineering Research Center for Wireless Integrated Microsystems (ERS WIMS)
 Javon Wims (born 1994), American football player

See also
 WIM (disambiguation)